Fiamignano is a  (municipality) in the Province of Rieti in the Italian region of Latium, located about  northeast of Rome and about  southeast of Rieti. Until 1927 it was part of the Province of L'Aquila, in Abruzzi e Molise.

References

External links
 Official website

Cities and towns in Lazio